Lori Lynn Ogren is an American former handball player who competed in the 1992 Summer Olympics.

College
She played volleyball, softball and basketball for the University of Minnesota Duluth. She was introduced in the UMD Athletic Hall of Fame in 2001.

References

Living people
People from Bayfield County, Wisconsin
American female handball players
Olympic handball players of the United States
Handball players at the 1992 Summer Olympics
University of Minnesota Duluth alumni
Year of birth missing (living people)
21st-century American women